Sturm (German for storm) may refer to:

People
 Sturm (surname), surname (includes a list)
 Saint Sturm (c. 705–779), 8th-century monk

Food
 Federweisser, known as Sturm in Austria, wine in the fermentation stage
 Sturm Foods, an American dry grocery manufacturer

Arts and media
 Der Sturm, early 20th-century German magazine covering the Expressionism movement
 Der Sturm, German title of Shakespeare's play The Tempest
 Sturm (novella), a 1923 novella by Ernst Jünger
 Sturm, an album by The Notwist
 Sturm, a fictional character in the Advance Wars video games
 Sturm, a fictional character in The Books of Faerie series by Vertigo Comics

Other uses
 SK Sturm Graz, a football team based in Graz in Austria

See also
 Sturm Brightblade, a fictional character in the Dragonlance campaign setting
 Sturm College of Law, the law school at the University of Denver
 Sturm–Liouville theory, a mathematical theory concerning the solutions of certain differential equations
 Sturm, Ruger & Co., a firearms manufacturer
 Sturm series, associated with polynomials
 Sturm's theorem, a method for counting the number of distinct real roots of a polynomial
 Sturm und Drang, a period of cultural revival in Germany during the 18th century